Bukovica is a geographical region in Croatia. It lies in northern Dalmatia, with Lika to the north, Kninska Krajina to the east, and Ravni Kotari to the southwest.

History 
Vlachs were recorded among the inhabitants of the region in 1420. Their basic economic activity was related to transhumant livestock breeding in conjunction with carrying merchants’ goods.

Many Vlachs (also recorded as Morlachs) moved to the Ottoman areas in the Dalmatian hinterland which were occupied by 1573 from Bukovica.

Geography
Bukovica is a small plateau region about 250 to 300 meters above sea level. The karst landscape covers most of the region up to the Zrmanja valley.

Towns and villages
Bukovica covers a triangular area between the towns of Benkovac, Obrovac, and Knin.
The region includes the municipalities of Jasenice, Ervenik, Kistanje, and Lišane Ostrovičke.

See also
Geography of Croatia

References

Further reading

 

Regions of Croatia
Dalmatia